Sander Hollanders (born 13 September 2001) is a Dutch basketball player who plays for BAL in the Dutch Basketball League (DBL). He also plays for the Netherlands national team.

Career

BAL 
Born in Kerkrade, Hollanders is a product of the Basketball Academie Limburg (BAL) youth academy. He made his debut in the Dutch Basketball League (DBL) in the 2017–18 season. In January 2020, Hollanders signed an extension with BAL until 2023.

In the 2020–21 season, Hollanders had his breakout season as he averaged 14.5 points per game and also won the Kees Akerboom Trophy after making 77 three-point field goals. On 7 February, he scored a career-high 28 points in a 81–58 win over Aris Leeuwarden. On 2 May 2021, he won the 2021 DBL Cup with his team after beating Yoast United in the final. Hollanders scored 17 points in the championship game. 

On 30 April 2022, Hollanders won the Dutch Rising Player of the Year award for the 2021–22 season.

Donar 
On 29 June 2022, Hollanders signed a two-year contract with Donar.

National team career
Hollanders played with the Netherlands Under-18 team at the 2019 FIBA U18 European Championship.

On 25 February 2023, Hollanders made his debut for the Netherlands senior team in a home game against Georgia.

References

External links
RealGM profile

2001 births
Living people
Basketball Academie Limburg players
Donar (basketball club) players
Dutch Basketball League players
Dutch men's basketball players
Shooting guards